Feldioara (or Barcaföldvár) is a commune in Brașov County, Transylvania, Romania, about 15 kilometres from the city of Brașov. It is composed of three villages: Colonia Reconstrucția (Bohntelep), Feldioara and Rotbav (Rothbach; Szászveresmart).

The commune is located in the east-central part of the county, in the northern  reaches of the Burzenland. It is situated on the left bank of the Olt River, which mostly follows the border with Covasna County. The Bârsa River discharges into the Olt near Feldioara.

At the 2011 census, 88.8% of inhabitants were Romanians, 6.9% Hungarians and 3.5% Roma.

Feldioara has a medieval fortress long believed to have been built by the Teutonic Knights. However, more recent studies show that the Fortress in Feldioara was actually constructed by the local community. The name of the village comes from the Hungarian word földvár, which means "the clay fortress". The ruins of the fortress can still be seen today. The German name Marienburg means "fortress of the Virgin Mary".

History
Between 1211 and 1225, Feldioara was the Teutonic Knights’ quarter, which will later become a peasant stronghold. A 1439 document states that the civilians of Feldioara built this fortress “with great financial and physical expenses” in order to protect their families and possessions. The fortress withstood the Turkish invasion of 1421, but it was severely damaged by a second invasion in 1432. It took until 1457 to restore it.

During the battles of 1612, the armies led by Prince Gabriel Báthori conquered the fortress, and in September the Brașovian armies had Feldioara under siege for three days. On September 16, 1612 a battle was fought between the Hungarians, led by Báthori, and the Brașovians, led by mayor Michael Weiss. The Brașovians lost the fight, and Weiss was killed on the battlefield.

The fortress – long out use for its original purpose – was used as a granary until 1838, when a major earthquake damaged it. After this event, even the fortress guardian left the building. Since then the fortress has lain in ruins.

Natives
Edith Soterius von Sachsenheim

See also 
 List of fortified churches in Transylvania
 Villages with fortified churches in Transylvania
 List of castles in Romania
 Rotbav Archaeological Site

References

Communes in Brașov County
Localities in Transylvania
Castles of the Teutonic Knights
Burzenland